Askia Ismail was the sixth ruler of the Songhai Empire from 1537 – 1539, and fourth from the Askia dynasty. Ismail came to power through a conspiracy generated by Askia Mohammad I, his father and founder of the Askia dynasty, with the aim of freeing Mohammad from captivity.

Directed to one of Mohammad’s Eunuchs, he was able to obtain gold. With this Ismail was then able to recruit men, allies and Suma Kutubaki, a friend of the ruling Askia Mohammad Benkan. The conspiracy came to fruition when Benkan was encamped at a village called Mansur. Benkan’s captains turned against him, he was deposed by the Dendi-fari, with the Dendi-fari capturing and chaining up most of Benkan’s inner circle.

Raised to power by the Dendi-fari, Askia Ismail was then able to release his father Askia Muhammad from Kangaba Island, bringing him home to Gao.

Ismail campaigned against the one called Bakabula in Gurma. Ismail gave charge of the cavalry to the Kurmina-fari. Ismail instructed the Kurmina-fari to chase and engage Bakabula and to hold out until Ismail arrived. In the ensuing battle the Kurmina-fari lost over 900 horsemen. However they succeeded in killing Bakabula and were able to take a large amount of booty. Shortly after this battle in December 1539 Ismail died. even though his short reign over the Songhai empire.

See
Tarikh al-fattash – Chronicle giving the history of the Songhay Empire
Tarikh al-Sudan – Chronicle giving the history of the Songhay Empire

External links

People of the Songhai Empire
History of Africa
History of Mali
16th-century deaths